Bhai is a 2013 Indian Telugu-language action comedy film, produced by Nagarjuna Akkineni under Annapurna Studios and directed by Veerabhadram Chowdary in association with Reliance Entertainment. It stars Nagarjuna Akkineni and Richa Gangopadhyay, with music composed by Devi Sri Prasad.

The Hindi-dubbed version titled Bhai: Mera Big Brother premiered on Zee Cinema on 23 October 2017.

Plot
BHAI Bhai is the most skilled and trusted enforcer of a Hong Kong-based don named David. David is heavily dependent on Bhai for his day-to-day operations. This is resented by his sons James  and Tony .

David sends Bhai to Hyderabad to finish off an undercover police officer who is disrupting the mafia operations in the city. In due course, Bhai bumps into Radhika, a horticulturist who falls in love with him. However, Bhai never accepts her proposal.

Bhai begins hunting down the undercover officer and uncovers his identity. The cop is Arjun, and Bhai decides to finish him off. On the day of the trial, Bhai finds out that Arjun is his brother after seeing his father Raghava with Arjun. He drops the plan and tries to walk out, but a video of Bhai aiming in Arjun with a gun are recorded. Bhai is not aware of these. However, Arjun is attacked by a few disguised armed men, and he kills all of them. Much to Bhai's shock, one of the deceased is Tony, who sets out to India on the suggestion of James in order to kill Arjun and gain David's appreciation. David is taken aback after realizing the truth and is hell-bent on killing Arjun.

Bhai's associate Munna asks him about his strange behaviour at the murder spot. Then he narrates his past to Munna. Bhai (aka Vijay) is Raghava's son who resides in a village near Warangal. His father is well-respected in the village, and Venkat Reddy is his opponent. Vijay almost used to spend his time with his siblings Arjun and Geetha .

The annual fest at the temple becomes a bone of contention between Raghava and Venkat Reddy as Raghava is hosting the function and Venkat Reddy is in strict disapproval of the happening of the fest. Venkat Reddy sends his son to set things on fire at the fest. He is found doing so by Raghava, who locks him in a room. The kid dies due to an unexpected injury caused by Raghava, which he was not aware of. Vijay takes the blame and is arrested to save his father's good will. After he returns from jail, Vijay ends up bashing Venkat Reddy's men. Raghava is infuriated and expels Vijay from his house.

Vijay reaches Hyderabad, and the rest of his life till date was all about his work in the mafia for David under the name Bhai. Bhai, his henchmen, and Munna try to save Bhai's family from David and James. Bhai meets Geetha, a techie who is going to marry Sandeep, a US resident. Bhai, after revealing his identity to his sister, comes to her home with his henchmen as the marriage planners on the request of Geetha to involve as the main person behind her happy marriage. Radhika too joins the team as a florist, and Bhai can't avoid her, though he wants to.

In the meantime, Bhai bonds with his family members; his paternal uncle and Geetha are the only people who know about his real identity as Vijay. To Raghava's shock, on the marriage day, Venkat Reddy makes a call to him stating that Sandeep is his foster son; he is not going to attend the marriage as he is house arrested. Bhai comes to Sandeep's rescue and his guts make Venkat Reddy reconcile with Raghava; the marriage plans are turning successful.

To avoid disturbances from David and James, Bhai and Munna get James kidnapped by their henchmen who pose before James as police in mufti. They bash him up, and in a turn of events, James escapes from their custody. While James, with David, goes to the airport to flee back to Hong Kong, the leader of the gang who bashed James is noticed by the duo. After the suicides of that leader and Munna, David learns about Bhai's games with them since Tony's murder.

Arjun, after watching the recording of Bhai aiming at him, tries to arrest him. Bhai cleverly manages to escape and attends his sister's wedding as per her wish. After Arjun is suspended and is kidnapped by James, Bhai pretends to be surrendered to the police only to confront them later. He spares them to escape alive and goes to Raghava's home with him. Raghava, who learned about the past from Bhai's paternal uncle, reconciles with him. The film ends with Bhai accepting Radhika's love on the suggestion of Raghava and his family.

Cast

Music

Music was composed by Devi Sri Prasad. Music was released on 14 October 2013 through Aditya Music. The soundtrack consists of 5 songs which received positive talk.

Production

Casting
Richa Gangopadhyay played the lead role opposite Nagarjun and Sonu Sood played an important role in this film. Brazilian model and actress Nathalia Kaur will be shaked a leg with Nagarjuna in this film. Hamsa Nandini shared screen space with Nagarjuna in a special song for this film. Kamna Jethmalani was roped in for a special role in the film. Sekhar Kammula's Life Is Beautiful fame Zara Shah got the chance to work with Nagarjuna in this film. Brahmanandam played a crucial role as an NRI.

Filming
Bhai was launched with a formal pooja ceremony at Annapurna Studios, Hyderabad on 26 November 2012. Akkineni Nagarjuna, Amala, Veerabhadram Chowdary, Richa Gangopadhyay and others attended. The regular shooting of the film will starts from December. The first schedule of the movie started on 4 January 2013 in Bangkok. The film completed its Bangkok schedule on 18 January. Some part of the item song was shot in Bangkok schedule on Nagarjuna and Nathalia Kaur.The remaining part of the song was shot at Annapurna studios on Nagarjuna and Nathalia Kaur. An extravagant marriage set was erected in Annapurna Studios for few important scenes. The film has completed a schedule in Slovenia in which two songs were shot on Nagarjuna and Richa Gangopadhyay. Few scenes were shot on Nagarjuna and Richa Gangopadhyaya at Chiraan Fort Club in Hyderabad. Fight sequence of the film was shot on Nagarjuna and Sonu Sood in Aluminium Factory, at Hyderabad. Few intriguing sequences of this film was shot in Predjama castle. The final shoot of the film for the final song was started on 5 September 2013 at Annapurna studios under the supervising of Raju Sundaram master.

Home media
Leading entertainment channel Zee Telugu, has secured the satellite rights of the film Bhai. The channel spent a whopping  60 million for the rights. This is the highest ever rate that any Nagarjuna film has fetched till date.

Box office
Bhai opened 80% – 100% occupancy on first day collected  85 million at the box office. The film first weekend collection is  308.8 million at the box office.

Critical reception
Bhai received mixed to negative reviews from critics: 123telugu.com gave 2.25 out of 5 and wrote "Bhai is a disappointment and it ends up as a damp squib". The Hindu wrote "Bhai is an ordeal to sit through unless you're interested in punch lines" and "Nagarjuna is the silver lining in this mediocre fare".

filmfog.com gave 3.5/10 stating that 'Skip this movie watching in theatres'. Maastars gave 1/5 Bhai is a headache for Akkineni fans. Bhai has every chance to stand as one of the flops in Nagarjuna's career. apherald.com gave rating of 1.5 out of 5 for Bhai.

References

External links 
 

2013 films
Films shot in Bangkok
Telugu remakes of Malayalam films
Indian gangster films
Reliance Entertainment films
2010s Telugu-language films
Indian action comedy films
2013 action comedy films
Films shot in Slovenia